Mandarynkowy sen is the second studio album by Polish singer and dancer Mandaryna, released in 2005.

Background
The album was also known in Poland as Mandaryna.com2me and its original Polish title translates Tangerine Dream. The album's lead single "Ev'ry Night" became Mandaryna's biggest hit. Featured are also covers of Bon Jovi's "You Give Love a Bad Name" and Chris de Burgh's "A Spaceman Came Travelling", released as the follow-up singles. Furthermore, the album includes a cover of 2 Plus 1's "Windą do nieba".

Mandarynkowy sen reached number 1 in Poland (see: List of number-one albums of 2005 (Poland)).

Track listing

Release history

References

2005 albums
Mandaryna albums